Starpoint Gemini is a real-time simulation/role-playing game for PC developed by Little Green Men Games, published by Iceberg Interactive and released December 15, 2010. It received 4 sequels: Starpoint Gemini 2, Starpoint Gemini Warlords and Starpoint Gemini 3.

Gameplay and Plot
Within the setting of the game, players freely pilot a customizable starship within the Gemini star system, in which non-player characters continuously act out their roles with or without player interaction. Players may decide to engage in combat with other ships, or to gather resources by mining and trading. Players may also conduct research and upgrade and purchase additional ships. Later in the game, players may choose to participate in large-scale engagements against other fleets and battle stations.

Available ship upgrades include equipment such as shield emitters, grappling beams, plasma cannons and shockwave generators. The player can create their avatar at the beginning of the game with some starting maneuvers, which they can later upgrade during the game. Additionally, skills and maneuvers can be learned by gaining experience. Officers may be hired by the player for additional skills.

History 
On December 15, 2010, Starpoint Gemini was initially released.

On February 16, 2012, Starpoint Gemini was released on Steam.  

On January 13, 2020, an update was released restoring Windows 10 support and adding Steam Cloud functionality.

Sequel 
Starpoint Gemini 2 is the sequel to the original PC game and was released on September 26 of 2014. Most of the gameplay elements are unchanged, with most of the differences being graphical and technical improvements. Notably, movement is in a full 3D space and combat controls are more direct and action based.

Notes

References
 Some Thoughts On Starpoint Gemini - Rock, Paper, Shotgun
 Starpoint Gemini PC Review - ComputerGames.ro
 Starpoint Gemini - Review - Test - Gamers.at
 Standing out from the sci-fi crowd | MCV

External links
Official Starpoint Gemini website
Official Little Green Men Games website

Tactical role-playing video games
Space trading and combat simulators
Space combat simulators
Science fiction video games
Windows games
Windows-only games
2010 video games
Video games developed in Croatia
Iceberg Interactive games